The Iranian village of Talkhab, Zahedan is located in the Tamin rural district of the Central District of Zahedan County, Sistan and Baluchestan Province. At the 2006 census, its population was 68, comprising 16 families.

References 

Populated places in Zahedan County